The Marble Valley Bridge is a bridge located between the cities of Lakhdaria and Bouïra in northern Algeria. It is the highest bridge in Africa. The bridge falls under the draft National Road east–west highway that travels from west to east of Algiers.

Informations relating to the bridge 
 Height:  (Highest in Africa).
 Length: 
 Depth of bridge columns under the Earth's surface: 
 The cost of achievement: 1.500.000.000 dza.
 Bridge resistant to earthquakes.
 Side barriers in anti-shock.

See also
 
 

Bridges in Algeria
Road infrastructure in Algeria
Buildings and structures in Bouïra Province